Zach Thomas (born 1973) is an American former gridiron football player who played as a linebacker.

Zach, Zack, or Zachary Thomas may also refer to:

Zach Thomas (basketball) (born 1996), American basketball player
Zach Thomas (wide receiver) (born 1960), American former gridiron football player
Zachary Thomas (offensive tackle) (born 1998), American football player
Zack Thomas, a fictional character in the 1963 movie 4 for Texas

See also
Zachary Thompson (disambiguation)